The Symphony No. 2: Kleetüden; Variationen für Orchester nach Paul Klee (Variations for Orchestra after Paul Klee) by Jason Wright Wingate was completed in 2009 and consists of 27 movements, each depicting a painting or drawing by Paul Klee. In form, the movements are also variations on a musical theme based on the letters of the artist's name, each taking its title from the Klee work referenced.

The Symphony's movements, with English translation of titles followed by tempo markings, are as follows:
 Bewegung der Gewölbe ("Movement of the Vaulted Chambers") - Andante gotico
 Furcht vor Verdoppelung  ("Fear of Becoming Double") - Vivace misurato
Eros ("Eros") - Grave libidinoso
 Die Zwitschermaschine ("The Twittering Machine") - Allegro meccanico
 Gelehrter ("Scholar") - Lento con moto
 Flucht vor sich [erstes Stadium] ("Flight from Oneself [First State]") - Prestissimo
 Einsiedelei ("Hermitage") - Larghetto introspettivo
 Der Tod für die Idee ("Death for an Idea") - Vivace portentoso
 Zwillinge ("Twins") - Allegro compiaciuto
 Seltsamer Garten ("Strange Garden") - Largo germogliare
 Rechnender Greis ("Old Man Counting") - Andante calcolazione
 Fatales Fagott Solo ("Fatal Bassoon Solo") - Allegretto sinistro
 Uhrpflanzen ("Clock-plants") - Adagietto cronologico
 Fuge in Rot ("Fugue in Red") - Moderato rossastro
 Regen ("Rain") - Allegretto spruzzatina
 Paukenspieler ("Kettledrummer") - Grave morboso
 Ein Stückchen Eden ("A Fragment of Eden") - Andantino innocente
 Mit den beiden Verirrten ("With the Two Lost Ones") - Lento ansioso
 Leidende Frucht ("Suffering Fruit") - Lento antropomorfismo
 Ausgang der Menagerie ("Outing of the Menagerie") - Vivace zoologico
 Mädchen in Trauer ("Girl in Mourning") - Andante addolorato
 Schwarzer Fürst ("Black Prince") - Allegro bellicoso
 Gestirne über dem Tempel ("The Firmament Above the Temple") - Larghissimo contemplativo
 Katze und Vogel ("Cat and Bird") - Andantino desideroso
 Anatomie der Aphrodite ("Anatomy of Aphrodite") - Allegretto cubista
 Die Schlangengöttin und ihr Feind ("The Snake Goddess and Her Foe") - Con moto mitologico
 Ad Parnassum ("To Parnassus") - Allegro trascendente

References

21st-century symphonies
Music based on art
2009 compositions